Jean-Luc Montminy is a Quebec actor who specializes in dubbing. He has been the French voice of Bruce Willis, John Travolta, Denzel Washington, Wesley Snipes, Andy Garcia, Colin Firth, William Fichtner, Kurt Russell and many others in the French version of their films in Quebec. He is also the French voice of Voldemort in the Harry Potter saga. His voice can be heard in nearly 1000 films, as an actor in a leading, secondary or other roles.

Career 

The official internet site for dubbing in Quebec lists Monminy as having done the voice-over in French for 304 actors featured in leading roles, including, for example, the voice-over for John Travolta in Killing Season—'Face à Face in French.

Montminy also lent his voice to 613 projects in which he did the voice-over for actors in secondary and other roles as well as animated films. He did the voice-over as Bruce Willis in A Good Day to Die Hard'''Une belle journée pour crever' in French.

According to the official internet site for dubbing in Quebec, Montminy is the dubbing actor who has most often performed the voice-over for Bruce Willis both in films in which he is a featured actor and in other projects. He is also the actor who has most often performed the voice-over for John Travolta, Denzel Washington and many others. He has also acted in Shakespearean plays, notably as the voice of Abra with Leonardo Dicaprio as Romeo in Romeo and Juliet. Filmography 
 1975: Y'a pas de problème (television series): Un policier et un bandit
 1977: Les As (television series): Satan
 1978: Race de monde (television series): Abel Beauchemin
 1982: (Une vie (album) – Une vie...) (television series): Jacques Richard
 1992: ''La Montagne du Hollandais (television series: François chamberland

 Dubbing 

 Film 

 Feature-length films 

 Bruce Willis in:
 Mortal Thoughts (Pensées mortelles) (1991): James Urbanski
 Hudson Hawk (Hudson Hawk, gentleman et cambrioleur) (1991): Eddie 'Hudson Hawk' Hawkins
 Striking Distance (Sur les traces de l'ennemi) (1993): Tom Hardy
 Color of Night (La Couleur de la nuit) (1994): Dr. Bill Capa
 Die Hard with a Vengeance (Une journée en enfer – Marche ou crève: Vengeance définitive) (1995): Lieutenant John McClane
 12 Monkeys (L'Armée des douze singes – 12 singes) (1995): James Cole
 Armageddon (1998 film) (Armageddon) (1998): Harry S. Stamper
 The Siege (Couvre-feu – Le Siège) (1998): Général William Devereaux
 The Sixth Sense (Sixième Sens) (1999): Malcolm Crowe
 The Story of Us (Une vie à deux – Notre histoire) (1999): Ben Jordan
 The Whole Nine Yards (film) (Mon voisin le tueur – Le Nouveau Voisin) (2000): Jimmy 'La Tulipe' Tudeski
 Disney's The Kid (Sale Môme – Le Kid) (2000): Russ Duritz
 Unbreakable (Incassable – L'Indestructible) (2000): David Dunn
 Bandits (Bandits) (2001): Joe Blake
 Hart's War (Mission Évasion – Le Combat du Lieutenant Hart) (2001): Colonel William McNamara
 Sin City (Une histoire de Sin City) (2005): Hartigan
 16 Blocks (16 blocs – 16 rues) (2006): Jack Mosley
 Lucky Number Slevin (Slevin – Bonne Chance Slevin) (2006): M. Goodkat
 (Le Fermier astronaute) (2006): Colonel Masterson
 Alpha Dog (Alpha Dog (Mâle Alpha) (2007): Sonny Truelove
 Perfect Stranger (Dangereuse Séduction – Parfait Inconnu) (2007): Harisson Hill
 Red (Red) (2010): Frank Moses
 Cop Out (Top Cops – Flics en service) (2010): Jimmy Monroe
 The Expendables (2010 film) (Expendables: Unité Spéciale – Les Sacrifiés) (2010): M. Chapelle
 Looper (Looper) (2012): Joe âgé
 The Expendables 2  (Expendables 2: Unité spéciale – Les Sacrifiés 2: De retour au combat) (2012): M. Chapelle
 A Good Day to Die Hard (Die Hard: Belle journée pour mourir) (2013): John McClane
 Red 2 (film) (Red 2) (2014): Frank Moses
 Sin City: A Dame to Kill For (Sin City: J'ai tué pour elle) (2014): John HartiganJohn Travolta in:
 Look Who's Talking Too (Allô maman, c'est encore moi) (1990): James Ubriacco
 Look Who's Talking Now (Allô maman, c'est Noël) (1993): James Ubriacco
 Get Shorty (Get Shorty – C'est le petit qu'il nous faut) (1995): Chili Palmer
 Phenomenon (Phénomène) (1996): George Malley
 Michael(Michael (film, 1996) – Michael) (1996):  Michael
 Face/Off (Volte-face – Double Identité) (1997): Sean Archer – Castor Troy
 Primary Colors (Primary Colors – Couleurs primaires) (1998): Jack Stanton
 A Civil Action (Préjudice – Une action au civil) (1998): Jan Schlichtmann
 The General's Daughter (Le Déshonneur d'Elisabeth Campbell) (1999): Paul Brenner
 Battlefield Earth (Terre, champ de bataille) (2000): Terl
 Lucky Numbers (Le Bon Numéro – Combinaison gagnante) (2000): Russ Richards
 Swordfish (Opération Espadon – Opération Swordfish) (2001): Gabriel Shear
 Domestic Disturbance (L'Intrus – Drame familial) (2001): Frank Morrison
 Basic (Formation extrême) (2003): Thomas « Tom » Hardy
 The Punisher (Le Punisher: Les Liens du Sang) (2004): Howard Saint
 A Love Song for Bobby Long (Love Song – Une ballade pour Bobby Long) (2004): Bobby Long
 Ladder 49(Piège de feu – Échelle 49) (2004): Mike Kennedy
 Hairspray (2007): Edna Turnblad
 Wild Hogs (Bande de sauvages – Les fous de la moto) (2007): Woody Stevens
 The Taking of Pelham 123 (L'Attaque du métro 123 – Pelham 123 – L'ultime station) (2009): Dennis « Ryder » Ford
 Old Dogs (Les deux font la père) (2009): Charlie
 Savages (Sauvages) (2012): Dennis
 Killing Season (Face à Face) (2013): Emil Kovac
 Denzel Washington in:
 The Pelican Brief (L'Affaire Pélican) (1993): Gray Grantham
 Philadelphia (Philadelphie) (1993): Joe Miller
 Crimson Tide (USS Alabama – Marée rouge) (1995): Premier officier Ron Hunter
 Courage Under Fire (À l'épreuve du feu – Le Courage à l'épreuve) (1996): Lt-Col. Nathaniel Serling
 The Preacher's Wife (La Femme du pasteur) (1996): Dudley
 The Bone Collector (The Bone Collector – Le Désosseur) (1999): Lincoln Rhyme
 The Hurricane (1999 film) (Hurricane Carter (film) – Hurricane) (2000): Rubin 'Hurricane' Carter
 Remember the Titans (Le Plus Beau des combats – En souvenirs des Titans) (2000): Herman Boone
 Training Day (Training Day) (2001): Alonzo Harris
 John Q. (John Q) (2002): John Quincy Archibald
 The Manchurian Candidate (Un crime dans la tête – Le Candidat Manchou) (2004): Ben Marco
 Inside Man (Inside Man: L'Homme de l'intérieur – L'Informateur) (2006): Détective Keith Frazier
 Déjà Vu (2006 film) (2006): Doug Carlin
 American Gangster (Gangster Américain) (2007): Frank Lucas
 The Great Debaters (Le Grand Débat) (2007): Melvin B. Tolson
 The Book of Eli (Le Livre d'Eli) (2010): Eli
 Safe House (Sécurité rapprochée) (2012): Tobin Frost
 2 Guns (2 Guns) (2013): Bobby
 The Equalizer (film) (Equalizer (film) – Equalizer) (2014): Robert McCall
 Wesley Snipes in:
 The Fan (1996 film) (Le Fan) (1996): Bobby Rayburn
 U.S. Marshals (film) (U.S. Marshals) (1998): Mark J. Sheridan
 Blade (film) (Blade) (1998): Blade
 The Art of War (film) (L'Art de la guerre (film, 2000) – L'Art de la guerre) (2000): Neil Shaw
 Murder at 1600 (Meurtre à la Maison-Blanche) (2000): Inspecteur Harlan Regis
 Blade II (2002): (Blade (comics) – Blade)
 Unstoppable (Incontrôlable – Indestructible) (2004): Dean Cage
 Blade: Trinity (Blade: Trinity) (2004): Blade
 Brooklyn's Finest (L'Élite de Brooklyn) (2010): Casanova Philipps
 Andy Garcia in:
 Desperate Measures (L'Enjeu) (1998): Frank Conner
 Ocean's Eleven (Ocean's Eleven (film, 2001) – L'inconnu de Las Vegas) (2001): Terry Benedict
 Ocean's Twelve (Ocean's Twelve – Le Retour du Daniel Ocean) (2004): Terry Benedict
 The Lazarus Child (The Lazarus Child) (2004): Jack Heywood
 Twisted (Instincts meurtriers) (2004): Mike Delmarco
 Smokin' Aces (Mise à prix – Coup Fumant) (2006): Stanley Locke
 Ocean's Thirteen (Ocean's Thirteen – Danny Ocean 13) (2007): Terry Benedict
 The Pink Panther 2 (La Panthère rose 2) (2009): Vicenzo
 Colin Firth in:
 Shakespeare in Love (Shakespeare in Love) (1998): Lord Wessex
 Bridget Jones's Diary (Le Journal de Bridget Jones) (2001): Mark Darcy
 The Importance of Being Earnest (L'Importance d'être Constant) (2002): Jack
 The Edge of Reason (Bridget Jones: L'Âge de raison) (2004): Mark Darcy
 Mamma Mia! (Mamma Mia !) (2008): Harry Bright
 Dorian Gray (Le Portrait de Dorian Gray) (2009): Lord Henry Wotton
 A Single Man (Un homme au singulier) (2010): George Falconer
 Kingsman: The Secret Service (Kingsman: Services secrets) (2015): Harry Hart / Galahad
 William Fichtner in:
 Heat (1995 film) (Heat (film, 1995) – Heat) (1995): Roger Van Zant
 Pearl Harbor (2001): père de Danny
 Equilibrium (2002): Jurgen
 The Dark Knight (Le Chevalier noir) (2008):  Le directeur de la National Bank
 Date Night (Crazy Night – Méchante soirée) (2010): le procureur Frank Crenshaw
 Teenage Mutant Ninja Turtles (Ninja Turtles – Les Tortues Ninja) (2014): Eric Sachs
 Kurt Russell in:
 Executive Decision (Ultime Décision – Décision au sommet) (1996): Dr. David Grant
 Vanilla Sky (Un Ciel Couleur Vanille) (2001):  Dr. Curtis McCabe
 3000 Miles to Graceland (Destination: Graceland – 3000 Milles de Graceland) (2001): Michael Zane
 Sky High (2005 film) (L’École fantastique – Sky High: École des Super-Héros) (2005): Steve Stronghold/The Commander
 Poseidon (film) (Poséidon (film, 2006) – Poséidon) (2006): Robert Ramsey
 Death Proof (Boulevard de la mort – À l'épreuve de la mort) (2007): Stuntman Mike
 Ralph Fiennes in''':
 1993: True Romance: Vincenzo Coccotti (Christopher Walken)
 1996: The People vs. Larry Flynt (Larry Flynt): Jimmy Flynt (Brett Harrelson)
 1996: Ransom (La Rançon): Détective James Shaker (Gary Sinise)
 1997: Air Force One (Air Force One: Avion présidentiel): Major Caldwell (William H. Macy)
 2004: Dawn of the Dead (L'armée des morts): Frank (Matt Frewer)
 2004: The Village (Le Village): Auguste Nicholson (Brendan Gleeson)
 2005: Harry Potter and the Goblet of Fire (film) (Harry Potter et la Coupe de feu (film) – Harry Potter et la Coupe de feu) (2005): (Lord Voldemort)
 2006: V for Vendetta (film) (V pour Vendetta (film)|V pour Vendetta): V / William Rockwood (Hugo Weaving)
 2006: The Prestige (Le Prestige): Nikola Tesla (David Bowie)
 2007: The Mist (Brume): Brent Norton (Andre Braugher)
 2007: Harry Potter and the Order of the Phoenix (Harry Potter et l'Ordre du phénix) (2007): Lord Voldemort
 2008: Mad Money (Folles du cash): Don Cardigan (Ted Danson)
 2008: Definitely, Maybe (Un jour, peut-être|Bien sûr, peut-être): Hampton Roth (Kevin Kline)
 2008: Drillbit Taylor (Drillbit Taylor, garde du corps|Drillbit Taylor): Jim (Ian Roberts)
 2008: Street Kings (Au bout de la nuit (film, 2008)|Rois de la rue): Capitaine Biggs (Hugh Laurie)
 2008: Made of Honor (Le Témoin amoureux|Un amour de témoin): Colin McMurray (Kevin McKidd)
 2008: Pineapple Express (Ananas express): Ted (Gary Cole)
 2008: W. (film) (W.: L'Improbable Président): George H. W. Bush (James Cromwell)
 2008: Max Payne (film) (Max Payne (film)|Max Payne): BB Hensley (Beau Bridges)
 2008: Appaloosa (film) (Appaloosa): Randall Bragg (Jeremy Irons)
 2009: Rebellion (Rébellion) (Defiance): Ben (Tomas Arana)
 2010: (Harry Potter et les Reliques de la Mort (film) – Harry Potter et les Reliques de la Mort) (2010): Lord Voldemort
 2010: Clash of the Titans (Le Choc des Titans) (2010): (Hadès)
 2012: Ted (Ted): Sam J. Jones (lui-même)
 2012: Wrath of the Titans (La Colère des Titans) (2012): Hadès

 Feature length animation films 

Montmincy is the voice of the following characters in animated feature films
 1997: Heracles (Hercule): Hadès
 2008: Beverly Hills Chihuahua (Le Chihuahua de Beverly Hills): Delgado
 2008: Horton Hears a Who! (Horton): Vlad
 2008: WALL-E (WALL-E): Shelby
 2011: Rango (Rango): Le maire

 Television 

 Television series 
  MythBusters (MythBusters (French) – Les Stupéfiants): Adam Savage
  Hemlock Grove (TV series) (Hemlock Grove (French) (TV series) – Hemlock Grove): Nicolae Rumancek (Don Francks)

 Television series – animation 
 2003: Les Enfants du feu'': Sorgo

Video games 
 2011: Assassin's Creed: Revelations (Assassin's Creed: Revelations|Assassin's Creed: Revelations): Al Mualim

See also 

 Dubbing (filmmaking)

Notes 
1. Since 2008, there has been an acceleration in imposing Quebec's language laws, including mandatory dubbing of films, or subtitles for smaller films, where the original language is any language other than French. "We will ask the (American) studios to explain to us how we can ensure, without resorting to a law, that Quebec citizens have access to versions dubbed into French in Quebec"

References

External links 
 
 The Quebec Official dubbing site – Jean-Luc Montminy (French only)
 Behind the Voice (voice-over for animated film)
 Embedded Language – Jean-Luc Montminy: Dubbing
 America’s films, Quebec’s voices: Double-dubbing and the reasons behind it
 Quebec wants answers on movie-dubbing issue
 Civil code of Quebec regarding mandatory dubbing

Male actors from Quebec
Canadian male voice actors
Living people
Year of birth missing (living people)